Karaözü is a village in the Sarıoğlan district of Kayseri Province, Turkey.

The villages is located at the corner of Kayseri, Sivas, and Yozgat provinces. It was founded in the late 18th century.

External links
Karaözü resimleri
Karaözü Istanbul Dernegi
Karaözü iletisim agi

Villages in Kayseri Province